The seventh season of the Dragon Ball Z anime series contains the Other World, Great Saiyaman and World Tournament arcs, which comprises Part 1 of the Buu Saga. The episodes are produced by Toei Animation, and are based on the final 26 volumes of the Dragon Ball manga series by Akira Toriyama. 

The 25-episode season originally ran from July 1993 to March 1994 in Japan on Fuji Television. The first English airing of the series was on Cartoon Network where Funimation Entertainment dub of the series ran from September to October 2001.

Four pieces of theme music were used for this season. The opening theme, "Cha-La Head-Cha-La", is performed by Hironobu Kageyama and the ending theme,  is performed by Manna. The second opening theme, starting with episode 200 onward, is titled "We Gotta Power" and is performed by Hironobu Kageyama, who also performs the second ending theme, .

Funimation released the season in a box set on November 11, 2008, and in June 2009, announced that they would be re-releasing Dragon Ball Z in a new seven volume set called the "Dragon Boxes". Based on the original series masters with frame-by-frame restoration, the first set was released November 10, 2009.


Episode list

References

1993 Japanese television seasons
1994 Japanese television seasons
Z (season 7)